Crowne Plaza Manila Galleria is hotel located at the Ortigas business district in Manila, Philippines. Built in 2004, Crowne Plaza Manila is the first Crowne Plaza property in Manila. The hotel has 263 deluxe and suite rooms. The current General Manager of the hotel as of 2019 is Jolly Barun.

Crowne Plaza was the first hotel in the Philippines to roll out a mobile Internet solution for its Wi-Fi needs.

In 2011, Crowne Plaza has undertaken a refurbishment of its ballrooms. The renovation of events space marks the facility's first make-over since it opened its doors in 2005.

In 2018, the bicameral conference committee for the Bangsamoro Organic Law was held in the hotel.

In 2019, the Philippine Fashion Week was held in the hotel, with it becoming its permanent home for the next three years.

References

External links
 Official Website

2005 establishments in the Philippines
Hotel buildings completed in 2004
Buildings and structures in Quezon City
Hotels established in 2005
Hotels in Metro Manila
Crowne Plaza hotels
Ortigas Center